Split Image (also known as Captured) is a 1982 American drama film directed by Ted Kotcheff and starring Michael O'Keefe, Karen Allen, Peter Fonda, James Woods, Elizabeth Ashley, Brian Dennehy and Ronnie Scribner. It tells the story of an all-American college athlete who becomes involved in a youth-oriented cult, and his family's struggle to bring him home.

Synopsis
Danny Stetson is a clean-cut, American college student and gymnast with dreams of Olympic gold when he's lured into Homeland, a youth-oriented religious commune, by a compellingly beautiful girl, Rebecca. Here he is programmed by the charismatic leader, Neil Kirklander, to believe that his new life now has the true meaning that it previously lacked.

Anguished by their son's disappearance, Danny's parents Diana and Kevin hire a modern-day bounty hunter, Charles Pratt, to abduct Danny and exorcise his brainwashed mind, but the psychological change could be traumatizing.

Cast

Awards

References

External links
 
 
 
 

1982 films
1982 drama films
Films scored by Bill Conti
Films about religion
Fictional cults
1980s English-language films
Orion Pictures films
PolyGram Filmed Entertainment films
Films produced by Don Carmody
Films with screenplays by Robert Mark Kamen
Films directed by Ted Kotcheff
American crime drama films
1980s American films